The Greater Toronto Bioregion represents a unique ecosystem that co-exists with the urban sprawl of the Greater Toronto Area. It is also part of the Oak Ridges Moraine system.

References

Oak Ridges Moraine
Ecozones and ecoregions of Ontario